Mordenheim is a fantasy horror novel by Chet Williamson, set in the world of Ravenloft, and based on the Dungeons & Dragons game.

Plot summary
Mordenheim is a novel in which Victor Mordenheim seeks to revive his dead wife in a new living body.

Reception

Reviews
Kliatt
Science Fiction Chronicle

References

1994 American novels
Ravenloft novels